State Route 45 (SR 45) is a north–south state highway in the northeastern portion of the U.S. state of Ohio.

History

1924 – Original route established; originally routed from Lisbon to Geneva along its current route from Lisbon to 1½ miles south of Salem, from 1½ miles south of Salem to 1½ miles north of Salem on a currently unnumbered road, along its current route from 1½ miles north of Salem to North Bloomfield, from North Bloomfield to Windsor on a currently unnumbered road, and from Windsor to Geneva along current State Route 534.
1931 – By this time, rerouted from North Bloomfield to Orwell along a previously unnumbered road, and from Orwell to Windsor along U.S. Route 322; original routing from North Bloomfield to Windsor decertified.
1932 – Extended to Wellsville along the former alignment of State Route 153 from Wellsville to West Point, and along U.S. Route 30 (formerly State Route 5 before 1926) from West Point to Lisbon.
1938 – Rerouted north from Orwell to its current northern terminus; former alignment from Windsor to Geneva certified as State Route 534.
1976 – Routed around Salem on newly completed bypass (southwest portion completed in 1972; bypass certified as State Route 45B in 1974).
1997 – From Lisbon to State Route 558 upgraded to divided highway.

Major intersections

References

External links

045
Transportation in Columbiana County, Ohio
Transportation in Mahoning County, Ohio
Transportation in Trumbull County, Ohio
Transportation in Ashtabula County, Ohio